Putney station may refer to:
Putney Bridge tube station
Putney railway station
East Putney tube station